Tin hat can refer to:
 A waterproof hat made of oil-finished cloth, traditionally associated with those who work outdoors in rainy conditions such as loggers
 Kettle hat, part of medieval armour
 Tin hat (military), the Brodie helmet of World Wars one and two (which is also the origin of the UK phrase "put the tin hat on [something]")

As a proper noun, Tin Hat can refer to:
 Tin Hat Linux, a Linux distribution
 Tin Hat, formerly known as the Tin Hat Trio, an acoustic chamber music group currently based in San Francisco, California

See also
 Tin foil hat, a headpiece associated with paranoia